Uravadum Nenjam is a 1976 Indian Tamil-language film directed by Devaraj–Mohan, starring Sivakumar and Chandrakala. The film is based on the play Vilimbu by Shanmugapriyan. It was released on 27 November 1976. A dubbed Malayalam version Aaru Manikkoor was released in 1978.

Plot

Cast 
 Sivakumar
 Chandrakala
 Suruli Rajan

Production 
The story of Uravadum Nenjam was conceived by Shanmugapriyan and prepared in 30 minutes. He also wrote the screenplay. It was adapted from his stage play Vilimbu.

Soundtrack 
The soundtrack was composed by Ilaiyaraaja.

Reception 
According to Sivakumar, the film failed at the box-office as audience felt the film did not have the right ending.

References

External links 
 

1970s Tamil-language films
1976 films
Films scored by Ilaiyaraaja
Films directed by Devaraj–Mohan
Indian films based on plays